Khoya paneer is a popular North Indian dish made with paneer (Indian cottage cheese), khoya (thickened milk), onion, garlic, ginger, tomato and Indian spices. 

It is a gravy dish and is usually spicy in taste. It is commonly available in restaurants and dhabas serving North Indian food. This dish is commonly eaten with Indian breads like roti and naan.

References

Indian cheese dishes
Cheese dishes
North Indian cuisine
Punjabi cuisine